Miechów  is a village in the administrative district of Gmina Sulęcin, within Sulęcin County, Lubusz Voivodeship, in western Poland.

See also
History of Germany

References

Villages in Sulęcin County